National Car Parks (NCP) is a private car park operator, with car parks in towns, cities, airports, London Underground and National Rail stations.

History

NCP was founded in 1931 by Colonel Frederick Lucas. In October 1948 Sir Ronald Hobson, together with his business partner Sir Donald Gosling, founded Central Car Parks when the pair invested £200 in a bombsite in Holborn, Central London to create a car park. In 1959 Central Car Parks took over NCP from Anne Lucas, the widow of Colonel Lucas.

Hobson and Gosling expanded the company by recognising the under-developed state of many post-World War II British cities and towns. The pair began buying vacant sites in city centres, converting them into car parks. NCP then began managing sites on behalf of third parties.

In 1998, after a flotation of the business on the London Stock Exchange was cancelled at a late stage, the company was bought by US-based property and travel services provider Cendant for £801 million with Hobson, Gosling, and their family trusts who owned 72.5% of the National Parking Corporation taking £580 million.

NCP was sold to 3i in July 2005 for £555million. In 2007, NCP was acquired by Macquarie European Infrastructure Fund II. In 2007, the outsourced services business was spun off into NCP Services. In August 2017, Macquarie Group sold NCP to Park24 and Development Bank of Japan.

Operations
NCP provides car parking across the UK. It has car parks at Heathrow Airport, Manchester Arena and Birmingham New Street railway station.

In 2014, NCP signed partnerships with online and mobile parking consolidators, having opened up its off-street pre-booking technology to third-party providers and parking retailers for the first time. Deals were struck with JustPark, Parkjockey and YourParkingSpace, enabling their users NCP spaces at over 100 sites.

Events

Since 2010, House of Holland has booked the Brewer Street NCP to host its catwalk shows for London Fashion Week; previous attendees have included Alexa Chung, Jamie Winstone and Rachel Bilson.

In Cardiff, Evans Cycles have created the Urban Duel, a BMX racing event that takes place in NCP Dumfries Place. There are plans to host this event at other car parks around the country.

Art Drive exhibited its collection of classic BMWs designed by famous artists including Andy Warhol, David Hockney, Jeff Koons and Roy Lichtenstein at the Great Eastern Street NCP in Shoreditch.

As part of the Manchester International Festival, NCP arranged a live relay screening of Kenneth Branagh’s new play Macbeth with hundreds of fans turning up to the open-air screening.

Controversies
In the early 1990s, NCP was accused of planting spies in rival group Europarks, but Britain's then biggest industrial espionage trial ended with the full acquittal of NCP chief executive Gordon Layton.

In November 2013, following the announcement that Hull was to be the UK City of Culture 2017, NCP managing director Duncan Bowins took to popular social media website Facebook and branded the city "a sh**ehole" – despite the fact that his car parks took over £1 million from the city each year. This "crude slur" led to Duncan Bowins winning the Award for "Most Inappropriate Use of Social Media" at the Hull Daily Mail Angus Young Awards 2013.

In December 2013, the Crawley News and The Argus reported that NCP staff had been parking in the town's limited disabled bays for convenience. An NCP spokeswoman subsequently issued a statement claiming the pair had parked there to clear leaves from the car park and that there had been nowhere else to park. However, when the Crawley News published a photo clearly showing spaces right next to the disabled bay, the firm's Head of Operations Nigel Sorenson called to apologise and admitted that the incident was "embarrassing and upsetting" for the company.

Part of a car park operated by NCP in Nottingham collapsed on 19 August 2017. Three vehicles were left dangling from the edge of the city centre car park from a floor roughly 50 ft (15m) above the ground, and the entrance and exit were blocked with fallen concrete.

References

External links

Companies based in the London Borough of Camden
Parking companies
Transport companies established in 1931
3i Group companies
1931 establishments in England